Yeddoconus is subgenus of sea snails, marine gastropod mollusks in the genus Conasprella, family Conidae, the cone snails and their allies.

In the new classification of the family Conidae by Puillandre N., Duda T.F., Meyer C., Olivera B.M. & Bouchet P. (2015), Yeddoconus has become a subgenus of Conasprella: Conasprella (Endemoconus) Tucker & Tenorio, 2009: synonym of  Conasprella Thiele, 1929

Species
 Yeddoconus boholensis (Petuch, 1979): synonym of  Conasprella boholensis Petuch, 1979 
 Yeddoconus boucheti (Richard, 1983): synonym of  Conasprella boucheti Richard, 1983 
 Yeddoconus grohi (Tenorio & Poppe, 2004): synonym of  Conasprella grohi Tenorio & Poppe, 2004 
 Yeddoconus ichinoseanus (Kuroda, 1956): synonym of  Conasprella ichinoseana (Kuroda, 1956) 
 Yeddoconus ione (Fulton, 1938): synonym of  Conasprella ione Fulton, 1938 
 Yeddoconus kimioi (Habe, 1965): synonym of  Conasprella kimioi (Habe, 1965) 
 Yeddoconus memiae (Habe & Kosuge, 1970): synonym of  Conasprella memiae (Habe & Kosuge, 1970) 
 Yeddoconus otohimeae (Kuroda & Itô, 1961): synonym of  Conasprella otohimeae Kuroda & Itô, 1961 
 Yeddoconus sieboldii (Reeve, 1848): synonym of  Conasprella sieboldii Reeve, 1848 
 Yeddoconus somalicus Bozzetti, 2013: synonym of Conasprella somalica (Bozzetti, 2013)
 Yeddoconus spirofilis (Habe & Kosuge, 1970): synonym of  Conasprella spirofilis Habe & Kosuge, 1970

References

External links
 To World Register of Marine Species

Conidae
Gastropod subgenera